Else Trangbæk (born 7 February 1946, née Thorsager) was a Danish gymnast. She competed in five events at the 1968 Summer Olympics. After her retirement from active gymnastics – with 26 national titles between 1964 and 1970 – she continued her education she became a university professor for sports history and a sports administrator.

Professional career
After finishing middle school in 1962 she was trained as a bank clerk and passed the exam as banker in 1969. From 1972 to 1974 she continued her education in evening classes and passed the university entrance exam. She then started to study for the teaching degree in History and in Physical Education. After her Diploma in Physical Education in 1978, she was hired as non-permanent lecturer in gymnastics by the Kopenhagen Sports Institute. In 1980 her position was converted into a permanent job. Continuing her history studies at Copenhagen University she received her PhD in 1987. APS She was then promoted to Docent. From 1992 to 97 she was Director of the Sport Institute and succeeded in the integration of the separate sport Institute as a Faculty in Copenhagen University. In 1997 her position was converted in a Docent of the University. From 2002 to 2006 she was section Head in the Faculty.  In 2007 she was appointed full professor for Sport History. From 2007 to 2011 she was the Chairperson of the Sport Faculty. In 2011 she went into retirement. She became additionally External Researcher of the Centrum för Idrottsforskning, Stockholm. For her achievements she received the prestigious Women and Sport Award of the IOC which is only given to one woman per year per continent at the occasion of the World Women's Day.

Research
Else Trangbæk has internationalized the Scandinavian experience and research in the history of women sports. She showed that public physical activities of women such as ice skating, bicycling, etc. played a greater role for women than the role as a female sports administrator would have done. She started very early in interviewing active sports women of the first generation by means of Oral History. The WorldCat has 425 title of her as of 26 November 2021.

Honorary positions
 1984–1996: Chair Danish sports historians
 1987–1992: Member of the research Committee Danish elite sports
 1996–1999: Chair research Committee Danish sports research 
 1996–2002: Vice president European committee for sports history
 1997–2003: Chair Sport Committee City of Copenhagen 
 2002–2009: Member of the board of the Danish National Olympic Committee (DIF) 
 2004–2012: Member of the advisory committee of the Danish Ministry of Education 
 2008–2010: Member of the Board of Team Danmark (= Danish elite sports organization)
 Since 2008: Chair Danish Hall of Fame of Sports
 Since 2010: Vice President Team Danmark

References

External links
 

1946 births
Living people
Academic staff of the University of Copenhagen
Danish female artistic gymnasts
Gymnasts at the 1968 Summer Olympics
Olympic gymnasts of Denmark
Oral historians
Sports historians
University of Copenhagen alumni